Spinipogon is a genus of moths belonging to the family Tortricidae.

Species
Spinipogon atrox Razowski & Becker, 1983
Spinipogon elaphroterus Razowski & Becker, 1986
Spinipogon harmozones Razowski, 1986
Spinipogon ialtris Razowski, 1986
Spinipogon luxuria Razowski, 1993
Spinipogon misahualli Razowski & Becker, 2002
Spinipogon resthavenensis Metzler & Sabourin, 2002
Spinipogon signata Razowski, 1967
Spinipogon spiniferus Razowski, 1967
Spinipogon studiosus Razowski & Becker, 1993
Spinipogon thes Razowski & Becker, 1983
Spinipogon trivius Razowski, 1967
Spinipogon veracruzanus Razowski & Becker, 1986
Spinipogon virginanus Razowski & Becker, 2007

See also
List of Tortricidae genera

References

 , 1967, Acta zool. cracov. 12: 199
 , 2011: Diagnoses and remarks on genera of Tortricidae, 2: Cochylini (Lepidoptera: Tortricidae). Shilap Revista de Lepidopterologia 39 (156): 397–414.
 , 2005 World Catalogue of Insects, 6
 , 2002: Systematic and faunistic data on Neotropical Cochylini (Lepidoptera: Tortricidae), with descriptions of new species. Part.1. Acta zool. cracov. 45: 287-316

External links
tortricidae.com

Cochylini
Tortricidae genera